The 1987 All-Ireland Senior Camogie Championship. The championship was won by Kilkenny who defeated  Cork by a nine-point margin in the final. The match drew an attendance of 5,496. It was the last All Ireland championship to be played over 50 minutes.

Semi-finals
Irene O'Leary cashed in on two goalkeeping lapses in the final 60 seconds to earn Cork a place in the final against Wexford who had led for much of the game. Angela Downey took her scores from limited opportunities in the second semi-final and her sister, Ann, added two long-range points.

Final
A first half goal each from Angela and Ann Downey won the final from Kilkenny. Mary Geaney scored Cork's goal. During the presentation ceremony Bridie McGarry accurately predicted that Kilkenny would be back for four in a row in 1988. Pat Roche wrote in the Irish Times:
It speaks well for the players eyesight, let alone their accuracy, that they could see the mini-posts dwarfed in the shadows of the main construction. But it was still another good day for the game and proved yet another opportunity for the Downey sisters to impress in an outstanding Kilkenny win. Kilkenny's captain Bridie McGarry was the star of the winner's defence. There was no doubting the skills of Angela Downey in the Kilkenny attack. Whenever she got even the half chance, you could bank on a Kilkenny score. She darted like a frightened coursing hare in and around the Cork defence to slap over four points in a five-minute spell. Her sister, Anne, was equally effective further out, maintaining the flow towards over-worked Cork rearguard.

Fathers and daughters
Christy Ring was marked by Shem Downey in the 1946 All- Ireland senior hurling final. In an amazing coincidence. Mary Ring and Angela Downey marked one another in the camogie final 41 years later.

Final stages

References

External links

1987 in camogie
1987